Los Alamitos ("The Little Cottonwoods" in Spanish) can mean:

 Los Alamitos, California, a city in Orange County, California
Los Alamitos High School
Los Alamitos Army Airfield
 Los Alamitos Race Course
Los Alamitos Circle, the roundabout at the intersection of Pacific Coast Highway and Lakewood Blvd. in Long Beach, California
 Los Alamitos Creek in San Jose, California
 Los Alamitos Formation in Río Negro Province, Patagonia, Argentina, known for its Late Cretaceous fossils